Bhatri is an Eastern Indo-Aryan language spoken by the Bhottada tribe in Chhattisgarh and Odisha, India. The language is spoken predominantly in eastern Bastar district and in Koraput and Nabarangpur districts of Odisha.

References

Further reading 
 

Eastern Indo-Aryan languages
Languages of Odisha
Odia language